Mohammed Shihabuddin Nadvi (1931–2002) was an Indian Islamic scholastic philosopher, religious reformer and writer. He was born in the city of Bangalore on 12 November 1931 and wrote more than 100 books on the Qur'an, Hadith and modern science. He also founded Furqania Academy as a center for research on Qur'anic sciences in Bangalore in 1970. Some scholars regard him as Mujaddid; a religious revivalist. He died on 18 April 2002.

Major works
His books include:
 Evolution or Creation?
 The Holy Qur'an and Biology
 The Holy Qur'an Natural World
 Cloning Testifies Resurrection
 Qur'anic Code of Argumentation
 Qur'anic Concept of Knowledge
 Death of the Sun and the Doomsday
 Qur'an, Science and the Muslims
 Moon Sighting and Astronomical Calculations
 Rise and Fall of Muslims in Science
 Need to Institutionalize Zakat

References

External links
 Furqania Academy Trust
 Furqania Academy Waqf
 Mohammed Shihabuddin Nadvi
 Mohammed Shihabuddin Nadvi
 Mohammed Shihabuddin Nadvi

1931 births
2002 deaths
Islamic philosophers
20th-century Muslim scholars of Islam
Darul Uloom Nadwatul Ulama alumni
Deobandis